Brocton is a civil parish in the Borough of Stafford, Staffordshire, England.  It contains eight listed buildings that are recorded in the National Heritage List for England. All the listed buildings are designated at Grade II, the lowest of the three grades, which is applied to "buildings of national importance and special interest".  The parish contains the village of Brocton and the surrounding area.  The listed buildings consist of houses and cottages in the village, a country house and items in its grounds, and a military cemetery.


Buildings

References

Citations

Sources

Lists of listed buildings in Staffordshire